Matthew Minicucci is an American writer and poet. His first full-length collection, Translation, won the 2015 Wick Poetry Prize, and his second collection, Small Gods, won the 2019 Stafford/Hall Oregon Book Award in Poetry. Having received numerous fellowships and residencies, including with the National Park Service, the C. Hamilton Bailey Oregon Literary Fellowship, the Stanley P. Young Fellowship in Poetry from the Bread Loaf Writers' Conference, and the James Merrill House, Minicucci was named the 2019 Dartmouth College Poet-in-Residence at the Frost Place.

Career
After completing a degree in Classical Literature and Languages, Minicucci pursued his MFA at the University of Illinois; he has trained with Brigit Pegeen Kelly, Tyehimba Jess, and A. Van Jordan. His chapbook, Reliquary, marshalls the Stations of the Cross to explore themes later positively received in the full-length Translation. The Kenyon Review remarked the book's ″attention to craft as well as its thematic concerns and narrative devices [invoke] ancient history and myth to make sense of the poet's own personal history of loss.″

In his citation for the Oregon Book Award, judge and 2019 Pulitzer-prize winner Forrest Gander remarkedThe lexicon is inordinately rich, somehow both precise and lush. And the poems are insistently but never portentously philosophical, grounded as they are in bailing twine, bared teeth, baptismal tears. Disinterested in irony, softly-toned, Minicucci opens depths inside us that we can sense long after we’ve closed his book.

Minicucci's poetry, essays, fiction, and reviews have appeared in Alaska Quarterly Review, The Believer, The Cincinnati Review, Copper Nickel, the Gettysburg Review, Hayden's Ferry Review, The Massachusetts Review, Oregon Humanities magazine, Passages North, Pleiades, Poetry, Poetry Northwest, Salamander, Southern Indiana Review, The Southern Review, Tupelo Quarterly, the Virginia Quarterly Review, and West Branch, among others. It has also been featured on Verse Daily and Poetry Daily.

He serves as a member of the advisory board for Ninth Letter, and as senior poetry editor to Silk Road Review: A Literary Crossroads. Minicucci has taught writing at the University of Illinois at Urbana-Champaign, Millikin University, Pacific University, the University of Portland, and Linfield College. He is currently a senior fellow with the Blount Scholars Program at the University of Alabama.

Bibliography

Books

Anthologies

Reviews

External links
 Official website
 Goodreads profile

References

Formalist poets
Latin–English translators
University of Massachusetts Amherst alumni
University of Illinois Urbana-Champaign alumni
Writers from Massachusetts
Poets from Massachusetts
Writers from Alabama
Poets from Alabama
American male poets
21st-century American poets
Living people
1981 births
21st-century translators
21st-century American male writers